Montreuil-aux-Lions is a commune in the Aisne department in Hauts-de-France in northern France.

Population

Mayors
 Charles Bauchot (1983-1989)
 Jacques Delammare (1989-2001)
 Yves Fouquet (2001-2008)
 Olivier Devron (2008-)

See also
Communes of the Aisne department

References

Communes of Aisne
Aisne communes articles needing translation from French Wikipedia